is a passenger railway station  located in the city of   Nishinomiya Hyōgo Prefecture, Japan. It is operated by the private transportation company Hanshin Electric Railway. The station is called "Hanshin Nishinomiya" or "Han-Nishi" to distinguish the name from Nishinomiya Station on the JR West Tōkaidō Line (JR Kōbe Line) and Nishinomiya-kitaguchi Station on Hankyu Railway.

Lines

Layout

The station has two elevated island platforms serving four tracks. Two side tracks are located on the west side of the platforms and between two through tracks. The side tracks are used for express trains.

Platforms

Gallery

History
Nishinomiya Station on the Hanshin Main Line opened on 12 April 1905.

On 17 January 1995, the station was damaged by the Great Hanshin earthquake. Service in the affected area was restored by 26 June 1995.

Station numbering was introduced on 21 December 2013, with Nishinomiya being designated as station number HS-17.

Passenger statistics
In fiscal 2019, the station was used by an average of 24,126 passengers daily

Surrounding area
Nishinomiya Shrine
Ebista Nishinomiya (Hanshin Department Store, etc.)
Nishinomiya City Hall
Nishinomiya Hospital

See also
List of railway stations in Japan

References

External links

 Nishinomiya Station website 

Railway stations in Japan opened in 1905
Railway stations in Hyōgo Prefecture
Hanshin Main Line
Nishinomiya